Zion is an unincorporated community in Cecil County, Maryland, United States. The Isaac England House was listed on the National Register of Historic Places in 1980.

References

Unincorporated communities in Cecil County, Maryland
Unincorporated communities in Maryland